This article presents a detailed timeline of Quebec history. Events taking place outside Quebec, for example in English Canada, the United States, Britain or France, may be included when they are considered to have had a significant impact on Quebec's history.

1533 and before
1534 to 1607
1608 to 1662
1663 to 1759
1760 to 1773
1774 to 1790
1791 to 1840
1841 to 1866
1867 to 1899
1900 to 1930
1931 to 1959
1960 to 1981
1982 to present

See also

 List of Quebec general elections
 History of Quebec
 History of North America
 List of years in Canada
 List of Quebecers
 Quebec politics
 Timeline of Montreal history
New France

External links
Quebec History Chronologies
 1524-2003: From New France to Modern Quebec
 The 1837 Rebellions
 Le Bilan du Siècle (in French)
 National Assembly historical data (in French)
 Canada in the Making - Constitutional History
 Chronologie de l'histoire du Québec (in French)
 Chronologie historique des femmes du Québec (in French)
 Rond-point : Histoire du Québec (in French)
 L'influence amérindienne sur la société canadienne du régime français (in French)
 Les patriotes de 1837-1838 (in French)
 Histoire du français au Québec (in French)

 
Quebec-related lists
Quebec